was a general in the Nanboku-chō period of Japanese history. Takemitsu was the 9th son of Kikuchi Taketoki, and fought on the side of Emperor Go-Daigo as his father had done, a strong and dependable ally to Prince Kaneyoshi (懐良親王, also known as Kanenaga) (1326–1383) (son of the emperor Go-Daigo]]) in the struggle against the Kamakura shogunate . His most famed battle is the Battle of Oohobaru, fought on the banks of the Chikugo river in Kyūshū, in which he was victorious.

References

1319 births
1373 deaths
Deified Japanese people